Rızvan Şahin (born 30 October 1981) is a Turkish former footballer who played as a defender.

External links
 Guardian Stats Centre

1981 births
People from Çayeli
Living people
Turkish footballers
Association football defenders
Çaykur Rizespor footballers
Pazarspor footballers
İstanbul Başakşehir F.K. players
Giresunspor footballers
Süper Lig players
TFF First League players
TFF Third League players